The High Council of the Judiciary (or CSM) is an Italian institution of constitutional importance, which regulates the Ordinary Judiciary of Italy. The High Council is based in the Palazzo dei Marescialli, in Piazza Indipendenza 6.

History 
The council was first named in Article 4 of law 511 of 1907, which instituted it along with the Ministry of Justice, essentially as a consultative organ, with a largely administrative role in the naming of individual officials within the judiciary. A few months later, Giovanni Giolitti's government passed law 689 of 1907 which defined the new council. Although, obviously, it was to run the judiciary in the name of King of Italy, its members were arranged as dependents of the government.

The council's functions remained largely unchanged until the Constitution of the Italian Republic of 1947, which radically transformed the council from a consultative-administrative organ of a ministry into a self-governing institution of the Italian judiciary.

Status
The High Council is a self-governing institution in order to insure the autonomy and independence of the judiciary from the other branches of the state, particularly the executive, according to the principle of the separation of powers expressed in the Italian Constitution. The Council is an "Institution of constitutional importance" (Organi di rilievo costituzionale) as confirmed by the Constitutional Court, since it is referred to by the Italian Constitution.

For many years it was disputed as to whether the High Council was a "Constitutional Institution" or merely an "Institution of Constitutional Importance" and the identification of specific problems with the Council was very problematic. In fact, the performance of some powers and functions by the Council, which are not explicitly mentioned in the Constitution, has often caused political tensions. These include the "functions of representation of the judicial power in interactions with other powers", like, for example, making proposals to the Minister of Justice on matters under his or her control, giving opinions on the drafting of laws relating to the judiciary and generally pronouncing its opinion on any matter relating to the functioning of the judiciary.

Functions 
Article 110 of the Constitution assigns the task of "the organisation and the running of services relating to the judiciary" to the Ministry of Justice, notwithstanding the powers of the High Council. However, article 101.2 guarantees the full autonomy and independence of judges from all other powers, saying that they "are subject only to the laws." The High Council is the institution which ensures the autonomy of the judiciary, with responsibility for the Criminal and Civil branches of the Ordinary Judiciary.

The Council has competence in matters relating to the criminal and civil judges (judges in the administrative, auditing and military courts have their own governing institutions, which are distinct from the High Council). These matters are:
appointment of magistrates (always through a public examination);
assignment of magistrates to a specific role;
promotions;
transfers;
subsidies for magistrates and their families;
appointment of magistrates to the Supreme Court of Cassation

The law establishing the Council allows the Minister of Justice to make requests and observations on matters under the Council's control; the minister can participate in sessions of the Council when asked by the President or when the minister considers it appropriate to communicate with it. The minister also has the power to present information to the heads of the courts about the functioning of the judiciary and to express agreement on the nominations of heads of judicial offices. Although the minister of Justice can suggest disciplinary action, it is up to the Council to decide whether to follow the suggestions of the minister.

At the prompting of the minister of Justice, the Council has the power to identify disadvantaged locations in order to consider the transfer of judges to those locations. This means that the transfer may not have been requested by the judge (although they may have indicated their agreement or availability) and that the Council determines the disposition of magistrates in disadvantaged locations. The transfer must involve a change of Region and the new location must be more than a hundred and fifty kilometres from the location where the judge was trained or worked previously. The judicial offices considered to be "disadvantaged" are those of Basilicata, Calabria, Sicily, and Sardinia, where there has been a failure to fill the places available by examination, more than 50% of staff positions are unfilled, there is a high crime rate (especially related to organised crime), and a high rate of civil cases for the district's size and the number of staff.

Appeal against disciplinary sanctions is through a separate process which includes eventual appeal to the court of cassation.

Political role 
There is often controversy when the Council intervenes in the political sphere, on the grounds of protecting the independence and autonomy of the judiciary from external attacks, and when the Council passes regulatory acts. There have been political attempts to limit the Council's ability to make regulations, such as the constitutional reform proposals of Massimo D'Alema (which were never approved).

The Council has no right to make political pronouncements and therefore has no political role, strictly speaking, and does not establish or pursue any political objectives. However, under the constitution, the Council does have the role of governing the judiciary and protecting its autonomy and independence. Thus the Council has been accused by some politicians of playing a role which the constitution does not give it, extending its powers in order to conflict with those of Parliament and the Government.

Criticism focusses on two types of activity of the Council:
 The so-called "Papers for Protection" (pratiche a tutela) with which the Council intervenes to defend magistrates experiencing criticism for their judicial activities which it considers unfair;
 The "Opinions" (pareri) on draft laws being considered by the Italian Parliament, produced without request.
Especially when these express critical views of legislative activity, the reactions of the government and parliamentarians is very lively. In particular it is claimed that such activities are unconstitutional and indicate the Council's desire to make itself a "third chamber" (terza camera) of Parliament.

Individual members of the Council and the  often speak in defence of the Council's actions in these situations.

Defence of the "Papers for Protection" claims that citizens' right to discuss and criticise judicial decisions should not extend to the delegitimisation of the judge who has issued the decision and that the autonomous governing institution of the judiciary ought to intervene to protect the autonomy and independence of the judiciary as a whole in these instances. The internal regulations of the Council, signed by the President of Italy in his role as President of the Council, explicitly permit the "papers for protection."

With respect to the "Opinions", the law which established the Council expressly states that the Council "should give opinions to the Minister on draft laws concerning the arrangement of the judiciary, the administration of justice and anything else relating to the aforementioned in any way." Proponents argue that the Council ought therefore to express its opinions to the Minister of Justice so that they may take account of them in their discussions in Parliament. Critics argue that the "opinions" violate the separation of powers by intervening in the legislative process.

Composition 
The High Council of the Judiciary is presided over by the President of Italy, ex officio. The other twenty-four members of the council are elected. Two-thirds of the elected members (the "togate members") must belong to the judiciary and are elected by all the ordinary magistrates. One third of the elected members (the "lay members") are chosen by a joint session of the Italian Parliament and must be university professors dealing with law or lawyers who have worked in the procession for at least fourteen years. These lay members are to ensure that the autonomous and independent judiciary nevertheless remains subject to the interests of the state and does not become a privileged caste.

It is for the same reason that the President of Italy presides over the Council, although the President's role is mostly formal and symbolic, since the Council elects a Vice-President from among the lay members who performs all the functions of the council's president in practice.

The Italian Constitution does not directly state how many members the Council should contain, just the proportion of togate and lay members, so this matter is regulated by ordinary law. Currently there are sixteen togate members (two are judges of the court of cassation, four are prosecutors, ten are trial judges) and there are eight lay members. Thus, the Council has a total of twenty-seven members. These members cannot be re-elected immediately after the end of their term and they cannot be parliamentarians or regional councilors. The elected members of the council serve a four-year term.

Current members 

Twenty-four counselors are elected, 8 lay members and 16 togate members; three members hold their position ex officio: the President of Italy, the First President and the Prosecutor General of the Court of Cassation.

The current lay members of the council were elected by joint sessions of Parliament on 10, 11, 15 and 23 September 2014. The President of Italy is the council's presiding member, but the council elects one of its members as a Vice-President.

 Ex Officio Members: President of Italy, Sergio Mattarella; First President of the Court of Cassation, Giovanni Mammone; Prosecutor General of the Court of Cassation, Riccardo Fuzio
 Lay Members: David Ermini (PD), Alberto Maria Benedetti (M5S), Emanuele Basile (LN), Filippo Donati (M5S), Fulvio Gigliotti (M5S), Stefano Cavanna (LN), Alessio Lanzi (FI), Michele Cerabona (FI).

The togate members were elected by the ordinary magistrates on 12 July 2018. The results were as follows:
 For the Judges of Cassation: Piercamillo Davigo (A&I) and Loredana Miccichè (M Ind);
 For the Prosecutors: Luigi Spina (UniCost), Sebastiano Ardita (A&I), Antonio Lepre (M Ind) and Giuseppe Cascini (Area);
 For the Trial Judges: Marco Mancinetti (UniCost), Paola Maria Braggion (M Ind), Giovanni Zaccaro (Area), Gianluigi Morlini (UniCost), Corrado Cartoni (M Ind), Michele Ciambellini (UniCost), Alessandra Dal Moro (Area), Mario Suriano (Area), Paolo Criscuoli (M Ind) and Concetta Grillo (UniCost).

List of Vice Presidents 
 1959–1963 Michele De Pietro
 1963–1967 Ercole Rocchetti
 1967–1968 Adolfo Salminci
 1968–1972 Alfredo Amatucci
 1972–1976 Giacinto Bosco
 1976–1980 Vittorio Bachelet
 1980–1981 Ugo Zilletti
 1981 Giovanni Conso
 1981–1986 Giancarlo De Carolis
 1986–1990 Cesare Mirabelli
 1990–1994 Giovanni Galloni
 1994–1996 Piero Alberto Capotosti
 1996–1998 Carlo Federico Grosso
 1998–2002 Giovanni Verde
 2002–2006 Virginio Rognoni
 2006–2010 Nicola Mancino
 2010–2014 Michele Vietti
 2014–2018 Giovanni Legnini
 2018–2023 David Ermini
 Since 2023 Fabio Pinelli

See also 
 Italian referendums, 1987
 Italian referendum, 2000

References

Bibliography 
 Paolo Caretti and Ugo De Siervo Istituzioni di diritto pubblico Giappichelli Editore, 1996
 Edmondo Bruti Liberati, Livio Pepino, Autogoverno o controllo della magistratura? Il modello italiano di Consiglio superiore, Feltrinelli, Milano, 1998
 Elena Paciotti, Sui magistrati. La questione della giustizia in Italia, Laterza, Roma-Bari, 1999
 Stefano Livadiotti, Magistrati. L'ultracasta. Bompiani editore, 2009.
 Massimo Martinelli, La palude. Gremese Editore, 2008.
 Giancarlo Caselli, Assalto alla giustizia, Melampo, Milano, 2011
 Sergio Bartole, Il potere giudiziario, il Mulino, Bologna, 2012
 Giuseppe Di Federico (ed.), Ordinamento giudiziario: uffici giudiziari, CSM e governo della magistratura, Cedam, Padova, 2012
 Livia Pomodoro, Manuale di ordinamento giudiziario, Giappichelli, Torino, 2012

External links 
 
 

Judiciary of Italy
Institutions of constitutional importance of Italy